Catamount Pond is a lake located by Gale, New York. The outlet creek flows into Massawepie Lake. Fish species present in the lake are white sucker, smallmouth bass, brook trout, rock bass, yellow perch, and black bullhead.

References

Lakes of New York (state)
Lakes of St. Lawrence County, New York